Ni Lar San (7 October 1984) is a Burmese marathon runner who competed in the marathon event at the 2012 Summer Olympics.
She finished 3rd to last (105th place) in the women's marathon, with a time of 3:04:27.

References

External links
 

1984 births
Living people
Athletes (track and field) at the 2012 Summer Olympics
Olympic athletes of Myanmar
Burmese female long-distance runners
Burmese female marathon runners
Southeast Asian Games medalists in athletics
Southeast Asian Games silver medalists for Myanmar
Southeast Asian Games bronze medalists for Myanmar
Competitors at the 2009 Southeast Asian Games